Raphitoma pusaterii is a species of sea snail, a marine gastropod mollusk in the family Raphitomidae.

Distribution
This marine species occurs in the Croatian part of the Adriatic Sea.

References

External links
 http://zoosystema.com/42/16 Prkić J., Giannuzzi-Savelli R., Pusateri F., Russini V., Fassio G. & Oliverio M. (2020). Three new species of Raphitoma Bellardi, 1847 (Mollusca, Gastropoda, Raphitomidae) from Croatian waters (NE Adriatic Sea). Zoosystema. 42(16): 215-237

pusaterii
Gastropods described in 2020